Another Way Home is the debut and only album, by the Southern metalcore band, Remove the Veil.

Critical reception

JoshIVM wrote: "I'm so glad they stand away from the cliche southern metal vocals. Mark's raspy yelling fits perfectly and sets it apart from many of the clones out there. Although it may not be terribly original musically it is one enjoyable listen! This has been a good year for debut acts on Facedown and RTV are one of the better ones. (8.5/10)" E. Thomas of Teeth of the Divine writes: "Not too shabby, but hardly a groundbreaker either, but one of the more acceptable Southern inspired hardcore records I have heard and is certainly nipping on the heels of Maylene and the Sons of Disaster, so if you are a fan, check Remove the Veil out."

Track listing

Credits
Remove the Veil
 Mark Hendrix - Vocals, guitar, bass engineer, vocal engineer, guitar engineer, producer
 Pat Hood - Guitar
 Cliff McCall - Bass
 Mark Coxwell - Drums

Production
 Mike Dresch - Audio engineer, engineer, mastering, mixing
 Eldon Fisher - Audio engineer
 Dave Quiggle - Artwork, layout design
 Lindsey Wade - Photography

References

External links
Another Way Home review

2007 debut albums
Facedown Records albums